The Roman Catholic Diocese of Ahmedabad is a Latin rite suffragan diocese in the Gujarati Ecclesiastical province of the Metropolitan of Gandhinagar, yet depends on the Roman Congregation for the Evangelization of Peoples.

Its (Marian) cathedral episcopal see is (Our Lady of) Mount Carmel Cathedral, in the city of Ahmedabad in Gujarat state, western India.

Statistics 
As per 2014, it pastorally served 71,800 Catholics (0.7% of 10,274,000 total) on 14,791 km² in 45 parishes and 2 missions with 164 priests (89 diocesan, 90 religious), 455 lay religious (130 brothers, 325 sisters) and 11 seminarians.

History 
 Established in 1934 as Mission sui iuris of Ahmedabad from the Metropolitan Archdiocese of Bombay
 Elevated on 5 May 1949 as Diocese of Ahmedabad / Ahmedabadensis (Latin adjective)
 Lost territory on 26 February 1977 to establish the Diocese of Rajkot
 Lost territory on 11 October 2002 to establish the Archdiocese of Gandhinagar, which became its  Metropolitan.

Prelates 
Ecclesiastical superior of Ahmedabad
 Fr. Joaquin Vilallonga, SJ

Bishops of Ahmedabad 
(all Latin Rite, native Indians except the first)
 Edwin Pinto, Society of Jesus (Jesuits, S.J.) (born 1901 in present Pakistan, then also British India) (5 May 1949 – retired 1973), died 1978
 Charles Gomes, S.J. (1 July 1974 – 21 May 1990), died 2002
 Stanislaus Fernandes, S.J. (21 May 1990 – 11 November 2002), next Metropolitan Archbishop of Gandhinagar (India) (11 October 2002 – 12 June 2015), Apostolic Administrator sede plena of Diocese of Baroda (Gujarat, India) (23 May 2016 – ...)
 Thomas Ignatius MacWan (11 November 2002 – 12 June 2015), next Metropolitan Archbishop of above Gandhinagar (12 June 2015 – ...)
 Athanasius Rethna Swamy Swamiadian (29 January 2018 – ...).

References

External links 
 GCatholic.org, with Google HQ satellite picture - data for all sections 
 Catholic Hierarchy 

Roman Catholic dioceses in India
Religious organizations established in 1949
Roman Catholic dioceses and prelatures established in the 20th century
1949 establishments in India
Christianity in Gujarat
Culture of Ahmedabad
Organisations based in Ahmedabad